Ringmaster or The Ringmaster may refer to:

Ringmaster (circus), the leader of a circus
Ringmaster (horse show), the manager of a horse show ring

Entertainment
Ringmaster (film), a 1998 film starring Jerry Springer as a talk show host and Jaime Pressly
Ring Master, a Malayalam comedy film starring Dileep and directed by Rafi of the Rafi-Mecartin duo
The Ringmaster (film), a 2019 American documentary film
Ringmaster (comics), a supervillain created by Marvel Comics
The Ringmaster, a novel by Morris West
The Ringmaster, a novel by Vanda Symon
Ringmaster, a spaceship in John Varley's 1979 book Titan
The Ringmaster, a short-lived gimmick of professional wrestler Stone Cold Steve Austin
Ringmasters ("Ringmeister" in German), an honorific nickname commonly given to racing drivers for excellence at the Nürburgring circuit
Ringmasters, fictional crime lords and central antagonists in the animated series Rimba Racer

Music
Ringmaster (album), a 1994 album by Insane Clown Posse
Ringmaster (soundtrack), a soundtrack album from the 1998 film
Ringmasters (barbershop quartet), a barbershop quartet 
Hot RingMasters, a chart published weekly by Billboard magazine in the United States
"The Ringmaster", a song by Korn from The Nothing